The Samsung Galaxy Duos (stylized as SAMSUNG GALAXY DUOS) is a series of Android dual SIM mobile devices designed, manufactured, and marketed by Samsung Electronics as Duos.

Range

The Samsung Galaxy offers several different ranges of devices, including Smartphones, Phablets, Tablets.  Although widely known by marketing names, the underlying model ranges are best understood by looking at the model number.  Since August 2011, all the smartphones of the Galaxy series are categorized in the following way:
GT-x5nnn - Budget ("Realistic ") devices
GT-x7nnn - Mid-range ("Slim") devices
GT-x8nnn - Upper mid-range ("Loyal") devices
GT-x9nnn - High end ("Clever ") devices

where x = I, N or S and nnn = model number

Within the Smartphone ranges, Samsung often produces a Dual SIM variant, but these on not often widely available in many markets where retail dominance by Mobile Network Operators (MNO) who operate a SIM-locked business model naturally deprecates Dual SIM devices.

The model number of Samsung Smartphones will indicate the variant
GT-xnnn0 - mainstream model
GT-xnnn2 - Dual SIM "Duos" model
GT-xnnn5 - 3G/LTE model

Duos Models
The following phones are available as Duos models
GT-S6802 - GALAXY Ace DUOS
GT-S7562 - Galaxy S Duos (Dual SIM version of Galaxy Ace IIx / Galaxy Trend)
GT-I9082 - Galaxy Grand Duos
GT-I9192 - Galaxy S4 Mini Duos
GT-I8552 - Galaxy Win/ Grand Quattro
GT-I8262 - Galaxy Core Duos
SM-G530H - Galaxy Grand Prime
SM-G355H - Galaxy Core 2
SM-J110H - Galaxy J1 Ace Duos
SM-J500H/DS - Samsung Duos
SM-J530F/DS - Samsung Galaxy J5 2017
SM-A730F/DS - Galaxy A8+ Duos

Samsung "Dual SIM Always on" feature
In their marketing materials, Samsung uses the term "Dual SIM Always on” to describe the Duos phones, although technically the term is misleading since it does not mean quite what it says – both SIM cards are not always on. All phones with this feature are regular Dual SIM Stand-by (DSS) phones with 1 transceiver (radio) – 2nd SIM is always disconnected when a call is in progress on SIM 1 and vice versa.

The manual for such phone's states: “Your device supports dual standby with two different networks. You cannot make or answer calls on both networks at the same time.”

These Android phones have a menu option “Dual SIM Always on” which when activated activates call forwarding on the carrier's network. This can be done manually on any phone, regardless of manufacturer, e.g., enable call forwarding to SIM 2 when SIM 1 is connected. Call Forwarding must be provided by the carrier, often for a fee, subscriber will also be charged for call forwarding on a minute-by-minute basis, this depends on the subscription agreement.

“Dual SIM Always on” might sound like it is enabling the dual SIM capability of the phone. However, that control is elsewhere.  Each SIM card in a Samsung dual SIM phone can be set to on or off independently in the top section of the SIM card Manager menu. When both are set to ON, then both can connect incoming calls, but only one at a time. If SIM 2 is in use, a caller to SIM 2 will be redirected by the carrier network as though the phone were off or out of range. E.g., to voicemail. This is the default behavior, and it is what happens if “Dual SIM Always on” is set to "Offline". 
 
Setting “Dual SIM Always on” allows a call on one SIM to interrupt a call on the other SIM.

References

Samsung mobile phones
Samsung Galaxy